Robert Hagemes (born August 17, 1935) was an American bobsledder who competed in the late 1950s. He won a bronze medal in the four-man event at the 1957 FIBT World Championships in St. Moritz. He was from Allentown, Pennsylvania.

References

Bobsleigh four-man world championship medalists since 1930

American male bobsledders
Living people
1935 births